Four Surrealist Manifestos are known to exist. The first two manifestos, published in October 1924, were written by Yvan Goll and André Breton, the leaders of rival Surrealist groups. Breton published his second manifesto for the Surrealists in 1929, and wrote his third manifesto that was not issued during his lifetime.

First manifestos

Leading up to 1924, two rival surrealist groups had formed. Each group claimed to be successors of a revolution launched by Guillaume Apollinaire. One group, led by Yvan Goll, consisted of Pierre Albert-Birot, Paul Dermée, Céline Arnauld, Francis Picabia, Tristan Tzara, Giuseppe Ungaretti, Pierre Reverdy, Marcel Arland, Joseph Delteil, Jean Painlevé and Robert Delaunay, among others.

The other group, led by Breton, included Louis Aragon, Robert Desnos, Paul Éluard, Jacques Baron, Jacques-André Boiffard, Jean Carrive, René Crevel and Georges Malkine, among others.

Yvan Goll published the Manifeste du surréalisme, 1 October 1924, in his first and only issue of Surréalisme two weeks prior to the release of Breton's Manifeste du surréalisme, published by Éditions du Sagittaire, 15 October 1924.

Goll and Breton clashed openly, at one point literally fighting, at the Comédie des Champs-Élysées, over the rights to the term Surrealism. In the end, Breton won the battle through tactical and numerical superiority. Though the quarrel over the anteriority of Surrealism concluded with the victory of Breton, the history of surrealism from that moment would remain marked by fractures, resignations, and resounding excommunications, with each surrealist having their own view of the issue and goals, and accepting more or less the definitions laid out by André Breton.

Breton

A Surrealist manifesto was written by Breton and published in 1924 as a booklet (Editions du Sagittaire). The document defines Surrealism as:

The text includes numerous examples of the applications of Surrealism to poetry and literature, but makes it clear that its basic tenets can be applied to any circumstance of life; not merely restricted to the artistic realm. The importance of the dream as a reservoir of Surrealist inspiration is also highlighted.

Breton also discusses his initial encounter with the surreal in a famous description of a hypnagogic state that he experienced in which a strange phrase inexplicably appeared in his mind: "There is a man cut in two by the window". This phrase echoes Breton's apprehension of Surrealism as the juxtaposition of "two distant realities" united to create a new one.

The manifesto also refers to the numerous precursors of Surrealism that embodied the Surrealist spirit, including the Marquis de Sade, Charles Baudelaire, Arthur Rimbaud, Comte de Lautréamont, Raymond Roussel, and Dante. The works of several of his contemporaries in developing the Surrealist style in poetry are also quoted, including Philippe Soupault, Paul Éluard, Robert Desnos and Louis Aragon.

The manifesto was written with a great deal of absurdist humor, demonstrating the influence of the Dada movement which preceded it.

The text concludes by asserting that Surrealist activity follows no set plan or conventional pattern, and that Surrealists are ultimately nonconformists.

The manifesto named the following, among others, as participants in the Surrealist movement: Louis Aragon, André Breton, Robert Desnos, Paul Éluard, Jacques Baron, Jacques-André Boiffard, Jean Carrive, René Crevel and Georges Malkine.

Third manifesto
In 1929 Breton asked Surrealists to assess their "degree of moral competence", and along with other theoretical refinements issued the Second manifeste du surréalisme. The manifesto excommunicated Surrealists reluctant to commit to collective action: Baron, Desnos, Boiffard, Michel Leiris, Raymond Queneau, Jacques Prévert and André Masson. A prière d'insérer (printed insert) published with the Manifesto's release was signed by those Surrealists who remained loyal to Breton, and who had decided to participate in a new publication titled Surrealism at the Service of the Revolution. Participants, and thus loyal Surrealists, included Maxime Alexander, Louis Aragon, Joe Bousquet, Luis Buñuel, René Char, René Crevel, Salvador Dalí, Paul Eluard, Max Ernst, Marcel Fourrier, Camille Goemans, Paul Nougé, Benjamin Péret, Francis Ponge, Marko Ristić, Georges Sadoul, Yves Tanguy, André Thirion, Tristan Tzara and Albert Valentin. Along with Ristić, the Belgrade surrealists grouped around Nadrealista Danas i Ovde were aligned with Breton.

Desnos and others thrown out by Breton moved to the periodical Documents, edited by Georges Bataille, whose anti-idealist materialism produced a hybrid Surrealism exposing the base instincts of humans.

See also
 List of most expensive books and manuscripts

References

External links
Andre Breton's Surrealist Manifesto
The Manifesto of Surrealism (1924)
Complete text of the Surrealist Manifesto
Full text: Manifeste du surréalisme (French)
Manifeste du surréalisme, André Breton, various editions, Bibliothèque nationale de France (BnF)
Manifeste du surréalisme, University of Hong Kong, french
 cover, text

Art manifestos
Works about surrealism
Works by André Breton
1924 non-fiction books
1929 non-fiction books